The Schenectady Packers were an American basketball team based in Schenectady, New York that was a member of the New York State Professional Basketball League and the American Basketball League.

During the 1949/50 season, the team dropped out of the league on November 23, 1949.

Year-by-year

References

Basketball teams in New York (state)
Defunct basketball teams in the United States
Basketball teams established in 1948
Basketball teams disestablished in 1949
1948 establishments in New York (state)
1949 disestablishments in New York (state)